Bernard Sauvat (born 1941) is a French singer and songwriter.

A math teacher who taught physics, Sauvat was discovered in 1970 by Lucien Morisse, the director of Europe 1.

References

External links 
 Official Website (in French)

1941 births
Living people
French male singers
French singer-songwriters
French-language singers
French male singer-songwriters